Bolocera is a genus of sea anemone in the family Actiniidae.

Species
The following species are recognized in the genus Bolocera:
 Bolocera africana Pax, 1909
 Bolocera kensmithi Eash-Loucks & Fautin, 2012
 Bolocera kerguelensis Studer, 1879
 Bolocera maxima Carlgren, 1921
 Bolocera norvegica Pax, 1909
 Bolocera pannosa McMurrich, 1893
 Bolocera paucicornis Dunn, 1893
 Bolocera somaliensis Carlgren, 1928
 Bolocera tuediae (Johnston, 1832)

References

Actiniidae
Hexacorallia genera